Fruitland (formerly Elk Prairie) is an unincorporated community in Humboldt County, California.

A post office operated at Fruitland from 1890 to 1934. The isolation of this colony in a time when there was little adequate long-distance transportation ultimately led to the dissolution of the colony's fruit market.

References

Unincorporated communities in Humboldt County, California
Unincorporated communities in California